In metaphysics, A series and B series are two different descriptions of the temporal ordering relation among events. The two series differ principally in their use of tense to describe the temporal relation between events and the resulting ontological implications regarding time.

John McTaggart introduced these terms in 1908, in an argument for the unreality of time. They are now commonly used by contemporary philosophers of time.

History

Metaphysical debate about temporal orderings reaches back to the ancient Greek philosophers Heraclitus and Parmenides. Parmenides thought that reality is timeless and unchanging. Heraclitus, in contrast, believed that the world is a process of ceaseless change, flux and decay. Reality for Heraclitus is dynamic and ephemeral. Indeed, the world is so fleeting, according to Heraclitus, that it is impossible to step twice into the same river.

McTaggart's series

McTaggart distinguished the ancient conceptions as a set of relations. According to McTaggart, there are two distinct modes in which all events can be ordered in time.

A series

In the first mode, events are ordered as future, present, and past. Futurity and pastness allow of degrees, while the present does not. When we speak of time in this way, we are speaking in terms of a series of positions which run from the remote past through the recent past to the present, and from the present through the near future all the way to the remote future. The essential characteristic of this descriptive modality is that one must think of the series of temporal positions as being in continual transformation, in the sense that an event is first part of the future, then part of the present, and then past. Moreover, the assertions made according to this modality correspond to the temporal perspective of the person who utters them. This is the A series of temporal events.

Although originally McTaggart defined tenses as relational qualities, i.e. qualities that events possess by standing in a certain relations to something outside of time (that does not change its position in time), today it is popularly believed that he treated tenses as monadic properties. Later philosophers have independently inferred that McTaggart must have understood tense as monadic because English tenses are normally expressed by the non-relational singular predicates "is past", "is present" and "is future", as noted by R. D. Ingthorsson.

B series

From a second point of view, events can be ordered according to a different series of temporal positions by way of two-term relations which are asymmetric, irreflexive and transitive: "earlier than" (or precedes) and "later than" (or follows).

An important difference between the two series is that while events continuously change their position in the A series, their position in the B series does not. If an event ever is earlier than some events and later than the rest, it is always earlier than and later than those very events. Furthermore, while events acquire their A series determinations through a relation to something outside of time, their B series determinations hold between the events that constitutes the B series. This is the B series, and the philosophy which says all truths about time can be reduced to B series statements is the B-theory of time.

Distinctions

The logic and the linguistic expression of the two series are radically different. The A series is tensed and the B series is tenseless. For example, the assertion "today it is raining" is a tensed assertion because it depends on the temporal perspective—the present—of the person who utters it, while the assertion "It rained on " is tenseless because it does not so depend. The non-temporal relation of precedence between two events, say "E precedes F", does not change over time
(excluding from this discussion the issue of the relativity of temporal order of causally disconnected events in the theory of relativity). On the other hand, the character of being "past, present or future" of the events "E" or "F" does change with time. In the image of McTaggart the passage of time consists in the fact that terms ever further in the future pass into the present...or that the present advances toward terms ever farther in the future. If we assume the first point of view, we speak as if the B series slides along a fixed A series. If we assume the second point of view, we speak as if the A series slides along a fixed B series.

Relation to other ideas in the philosophy of time
There are two principal varieties of the A-theory, presentism and the growing block universe. Both assume an objective present, but presentism assumes that only present objects exist, while the growing block universe assumes both present and past objects exist, but not future ones. Views that assume no objective present and are therefore versions of the B-theory include eternalism and four-dimensionalism.

See also 
 Endurantism
 New riddle of induction
 Perdurantism
 The Unreality of Time

Notes

References
Craig, William Lane, The Tensed Theory of Time, Springer, 2000.
Craig, William Lane, The Tenseless Theory of Time, Springer, 2010.
Ingthorsson, R. D., "McTaggart's Paradox", Routledge, 2016.
McTaggart, J. E., 'The Unreality of Time', Mind, 1908.
McTaggart, J. E.,The Nature of Existence, vols. 1-2, Cambridge University Press, Cambridge, 1968.
Bradley, F. H., The Principles of Logic, Oxford University Press, Oxford, 1922.

External links
Time---Notes on McTaggart and the Unreality of Time-  Trinity College Seminar on Time.

Philosophy of physics
Philosophy of time
Concepts in metaphysics